Sphaerocaryum is a genus of Asian plants in the grass family. The only known species is Sphaerocaryum malaccense, native to southern China, Indochina, the Indian Subcontinent, Peninsular Malaysia, Philippines, and Sumatra. (Isachne pulchella was formerly included in this genus, as Sphaerocaryum pulchellum.)

References

Micrairoideae
Monotypic Poaceae genera
Taxa named by Christian Gottfried Daniel Nees von Esenbeck